Uday Lal Maurya is an Indian politician and a member of the 16th Legislative Assembly of Uttar Pradesh from BJP of India. He represents the Shivpur constituency of Uttar Pradesh and is a member of the Samajwadi party.

Early life and education
Uday Lal Maurya was born in Varanasi in 1958. He holds a Bachelor's degree. Prior to entering politics, he was an agriculturist by profession.

Political career
Uday Lal Maurya has been MLA for two terms. Maurya represents Shivpur constituency and is a member of the Samajwadi party. During his previous term, he represented "Chiraigaon assembly constituency" (constituency ceased to exist in 2008 after "Delimitation of Parliamentary and Assembly Constituencies Order, 2008" was passed).

Posts Held

See also

Government of India
Politics of India
Uttar Pradesh Legislative Assembly
Shivpur

References 

1958 births
Living people
Bahujan Samaj Party candidates in the 2014 Indian general election
People from Varanasi
Uttar Pradesh MLAs 2012–2017
Uttar Pradesh MLAs 2007–2012
Bahujan Samaj Party politicians from Uttar Pradesh
Bharatiya Janata Party politicians from Uttar Pradesh